Antim Pehlivanov (born 7 June 1959) is a former Bulgarian footballer who played as a forward.

References

External links

1959 births
Living people
Bulgarian footballers
Bulgaria international footballers
Botev Plovdiv players
First Professional Football League (Bulgaria) players
Association football forwards